130P/McNaught–Hughes is a periodic comet in the Solar System. It takes 6.65 years to orbit the Sun and is 4.2 km in diameter.

References

External links
 Orbital simulation from JPL (Java) / Horizons Ephemeris
 130P at Kronk's Cometography
 130P/McNaught-Hughes – Seiichi Yoshida @ aerith.net
 Lightcurve (Artyom Novichonok)

Periodic comets
0130
Comets in 2011
Comets in 2018
19910930